Bernardino de Meneses y Bracamonte, 1st Count de Peñalva (c. 1625 in Talavera de la Reina – 30 January 1656 in Cartagena de Indias) was a Spanish nobleman and military leader during the Anglo-Spanish War (1654). He participated in the Siege of Santo Domingo (1655) and was victorious over the English forces.

References
Rubio Mañé, Jorge Ignacio (1983). «Problemas de Expansión y Defensa», UNAM (ed.). El Virreinato, II: Expansion y Defensa (primera parte) 1 Edición, p. 93.

1620s births
1656 deaths
Counts of Spain
Spanish military personnel